In graph theory, the matching polytope of a given graph is a geometric object representing the possible matchings in the graph. It is a convex polytope each of whose corners corresponds to a matching. It has great theoretical importance in the theory of matching.

Preliminaries

Incidence vectors and matrices 
Let G = (V, E) be a graph with n = |V| nodes and m = |E| edges.

For every subset U of vertices, its incidence vector 1U is a vector of size n, in which element v is 1 if node v is in U, and 0 otherwise.  Similarly, for every subset F of edges, its incidence vector 1F is a vector of size m, in which element e is 1 if edge e is in F, and 0 otherwise.

For every node v in V, the set of edges in E adjacent to v is denoted by E(v). Therefore, each vector 1E(v) is a 1-by-m vector in which element e is 1 if edge e is adjacent to v, and 0 otherwise.  The incidence matrix of the graph, denoted by AG, is an n-by-m matrix in which each row v is the incidence vector 1E(V). In other words, each element v,e in the matrix is 1 if node v is adjacent to edge e, and 0 otherwise.

Below are three examples of incidence matrices: the triangle graph (a cycle of length 3), a square graph (a cycle of length 4), and the complete graph on 4 vertices.

Linear programs 
For every subset F of edges, the dot product  1E(v) · 1F  represents the number of edges in F that are adjacent to v. Therefore, the following statements are equivalent:

 A subset F of edges represents a matching in G;
 For every node v in V:    1E(v) · 1F  ≤  1.
 AG · 1F  ≤  1V.
The cardinality of a set F of edges is the dot product 1E · 1F .  Therefore, a maximum cardinality matching in G is given by the following integer linear program: Maximize      1E · x

Subject to:     x in {0,1}m

                      __  AG · x  ≤  1V.

Fractional matching polytope 
The fractional matching polytope of a graph G, denoted FMP(G), is the polytope defined by the relaxation of the above linear program, in which each x may be a fraction and not just an integer:Maximize      1E · x

Subject to:     x ≥ 0E

__  AG · x  ≤  1V.This is a linear program. It has m "at-least-0" constraints and n "less-than-one" constraints. The set of its feasible solutions is a convex polytope. Each point in this polytope is a fractional matching. For example, in the triangle graph there are 3 edges, and the corresponding linear program has the following 6 constraints: Maximize      x1+x2+x3

Subject to:     x1≥0, x2≥0, x3≥0.

__  x1+x2≤1, x2+x3≤1, x3+x1≤1.This set of inequalities represents a polytope in R3 - the 3-dimensional Euclidean space.

The polytope has five corners (extreme points). These are the points that attain equality in 3 out of the 6 defining inequalities. The corners are (0,0,0), (1,0,0), (0,1,0), (0,0,1), and (1/2,1/2,1/2). The first corner (0,0,0) represents the trivial (empty) matching. The next three corners (1,0,0), (0,1,0), (0,0,1) represent the three matchings of size 1. The fifth corner (1/2,1/2,1/2) does not represent a matching - it represents a fractional matching in which each edge is "half in, half out". Note that this is the largest fractional matching in this graph - its weight is 3/2, in contrast to the three integral matchings whose size is only 1.

As another example, in the 4-cycle there are 4 edges. The corresponding LP has 4+4=8 constraints. The FMP is a convex polytope in R4. The corners of this polytope are (0,0,0,0), (1,0,0,0), (0,1,0,0), (0,0,1,0), (0,0,0,1), (1,0,1,0), (0,1,0,1). Each of the last 2 corners represents matching of size 2, which is a maximum matching. Note that in this case all corners have integer coordinates.

Integral matching polytope 
The integral matching polytope (usually called just the matching polytope) of a graph G, denoted MP(G), is a polytope whose corners are the incidence vectors of the integral matchings in G.

MP(G) is always contained in FMP(G). In the above examples:

 The MP of the triangle graph is strictly contained in its FMP, since the MP does not contain the non-integral corner (1/2, 1/2, 1/2).  
 The MP of the 4-cycle graph is identical to its FMP, since all the corners of the FMP are integral.

The matching polytopes in a bipartite graph 

The above example is a special case of the following general theorem:G is a bipartite graph   if-and-only-if   MP(G) = FMP(G)   if-and-only-if   all corners of FMP(G) have only integer coordinates.This theorem can be proved in several ways.

Proof using matrices 
When G is bipartite, its incidence matrix AG is totally unimodular - every square submatrix of it has determinant 0, +1 or −1. The proof is by induction on k - the size of the submatrix (which we denote by K). The base k = 1 follows from the definition of AG - every element in it is either 0 or 1. For k>1 there are several cases:

 If K has a column consisting only of zeros, then det K = 0. 
 If K has a column with a single 1, then det K can be expanded about this column and it equals either +1 or -1 times a determinant of a (k − 1) by (k − 1) matrix, which by the induction assumption is 0 or +1 or −1.
 Otherwise, each column in K has two 1s. Since the graph is bipartite, the rows can be partitioned into two subsets, such that in each column, one 1 is in the top subset and the other 1 is in the bottom subset. This means that the sum of the top subset and the sum of the bottom subset are both equal to 1E minus a vector of |E| ones. This means that the rows of K are linearly dependent, so det K = 0.
As an example, in the 4-cycle (which is bipartite), the det AG  = 1. In contrast, in the 3-cycle (which is not bipartite), det AG = 2.

Each corner of FMP(G) satisfies a set of m linearly-independent inequalities with equality. Therefore, to calculate the corner coordinates we have to solve a system of equations defined by a square submatrix of AG. By Cramer's rule, the solution is a rational number in which the denominator is the determinant of this submatrix. This determinant must by +1 or −1; therefore the solution is an integer vector. Therefore all corner coordinates are integers.

By the n "less-than-one" constraints, the corner coordinates are either 0 or 1; therefore each corner is the incidence vector of an integral matching in G. Hence FMP(G) = MP(G).

The facets of the matching polytope 
A facet of a polytope is the set of its points which satisfy an essential defining inequality of the polytope with equality. If the polytope is  d-dimensional, then its facets are (d − 1)-dimensional. For any graph G, the facets of MP(G) are given by the following inequalities:

 x ≥ 0E
 1E(v) · x  ≤  1     (where v is a non-isolated vertex such that, if v has only one neighbor u, then {u,v} is a connected component of G, and if v has exactly two neighbors, then they are not adjacent).
 1E(S) · x  ≤  (|S| − 1)/2      (where S spans a 2-connected factor-critical subgraph.)

Perfect matching polytope 
The perfect matching polytope of a graph G, denoted PMP(G),  is a polytope whose corners are the incidence vectors of the integral perfect matchings in G. Obviously, PMP(G) is contained in MP(G); In fact, PMP(G) is the face of MP(G) determined by the equality:1E · x  = n/2.

See also 
 Stable matching polytope

References

External links 
 The matching polytope, by Michael Goemans
 The matching polytope, by Jan Vondrak
 The matching polytope, by Vincent Jost

Matching (graph theory)
Polytopes